Käthe Braun (11 November 1913 – 9 September 1994) was a German stage and film actress. She was married to director Falk Harnack and acted in several of his films.

Career 
Katharina Braun was born in Wasserburg am Inn. After studying acting privately with Magda Lena in Munich, she had her first theater engagement at the Bavarian state theater, Cuvilliés-Theater. In 1938, she began working at the Düsseldorf Schauspielhaus and in 1941, at the city theater in Strasbourg, staying there until Goebbels closed all the theaters in August 1944.

After World War II, she returned to Munich and, from 1947 to 1951, worked periodically at the Deutsches Theater in Berlin. She also played major roles in East German DEFA productions, such as Stine Teetjen, the wife in  Das Beil von Wandsbek, adapted from the book by Arnold Zweig and directed by her husband. Braun also became known for her role as the mother in several screen adaptations of Ludwig Thoma's five-part series of Scoundrel Stories (Lausbubengeschichten).

In 1952, her husband's first film was banned, and he ran into trouble with the Communists:  the couple left East Germany for the west. Braun began working at the Schiller Theater in West Berlin, as well as at the Schlossparktheater and elsewhere in West Germany. Among her roles were the lead in Das Käthchen von Heilbronn, Annchen in Max Halbe's Jugend, Rautendelein in Gerhart Hauptmann's Die versunkene Glocke, Electra in Eugene O’Neill's Mourning Becomes Electra, Gretchen in Goethe's Faust, the lead in Saint Joan, and several roles in German translations of Shakespeare; Hermia and Titania in A Midsummer Night's Dream, Desdemona in Othello, Viola in Twelfth Night and Ophelia in Hamlet.

Käthe Braun-Harnack died in Berlin in 1994 at the age of 80. In addition to her man, who died three years earlier, she was buried in the Zehlendorf cemetery.

Filmography 
 The Three Around Christine (1936) - Bärble
 Semmelweis – Retter der Mütter (1950) - Marie Lanthaler
 Das Beil von Wandsbek (1951) - Stine Teetjen
 Before God and Man (1955) - Katharina
 Roman einer Siebzehnjährigen (1955)
 Anastasia: The Czar's Last Daughter (1956) - Frau von Rathleff-Keilmann
  (1956) - Frau Henschel
 The Night of the Storm (1957) - Beate Hoberg
 Ein wahrer Held (1961) - Violet
 Die Laokoon-Gruppe (1963) - Mutter
 Mein Bruder Alf (1963) - Ellen Borlay
  (1964) - Theres Thoma
 Aunt Frieda (1965) - Mutter Thoma
 Hocuspocus (1966) - Frau Engstrand
 Onkel Filser – Allerneueste Lausbubengeschichten (1966) - Therese Thoma
 Unwiederbringlich (1968) - Julie von Dobschütz
 Ludwig auf Freiersfüßen (1969) - Therese Thoma
 Einladung ins Schloß oder Die Kunst das Spiel zu spielen (1970) - Mademoiselle Capulat
 Ein Fall für Herrn Schmidt (1971) - Frau Schurek
 Der Verfolger, Rolle der Oberin (1974)

Television 
 Das Kriminalmuseum episode: Die Postanweisung (1968)

Notes

References

External links 
 

20th-century German actresses
German stage actresses
German film actresses
People from Wasserburg am Inn